The 1987 Philippine Basketball Association (PBA) rookie draft was an event in which teams drafted players from the amateur ranks. The draft was held on February 16, 1987.

Round 1

Round 2

Notes
Shell traded their first round pick, along with Bernie Fabiosa and Philip Cezar, to Great Taste in exchange for Manny Victorino and Jimmy Manansala a week before the draft.
Magnolia and Shell waived their rights to the amateur pool.

Undrafted players
Dennis Carbonilla
Benjie Gutierrez
Guillermo Valerio

References

Philippine Basketball Association draft
draft
PBA draft
PBA draft